Hi-Res Adventures is a series of graphic adventure games developed by On-Line Systems (later Sierra Entertainment). It includes all seven graphic adventure games released by the company prior to the release of the company's landmark King's Quest.

Hi-Res Adventure #0 - Mission Asteroid (1980)
Hi-Res Adventure #1 - Mystery House (1980)
Hi-Res Adventure #2 - Wizard and the Princess / Adventure in Serenia (1980)
Hi-Res Adventure #3 - Cranston Manor (1981)
Hi-Res Adventure #4 - Ulysses and the Golden Fleece (1981)
Hi-Res Adventure #5 - Time Zone (1982)
Hi-Res Adventure #6 - The Dark Crystal (1983)

References

External links
HiRes Adventures/SierraVentures at Adventureland

Adventure games
Hi-Res Adventures
Sierra Entertainment
Video game franchises
Video game franchises introduced in 1980